The archery events at the 2021 Southeast Asian Games took place at Hanoi Sports Training and Competition Centre in Hanoi, Vietnam from 15 to 19 May 2022.

Participating nations

 (host)

Medal table

Medalists

Recurve

Compound

References

External links
  

2021 Southeast Asian Games events
2021
2022 in archery